Ernst Flersheim (born 1862; died in 1944 in Bergen-Belsen concentration camp) was a German Jewish art collector who was persecuted by the Nazis.

Early life 
Flersheim was born on July 13, 1862 in Frankfurt am Main. His parents were Louis Flersheim and Johanna Gütha Flersheim. He married Gertrud von Mayer (born August 2,1872; died September 13, 1944 in Bergen Belsen). Both were arrested, deported and murdered by the Nazis.

Art collection 
The Flersheim's collection included Ferdinand Hodler's "Thunersee mit Niesen", "A Prayer before Supper" by Jan Toorop and "Procession in the Mountains" by Adolf Hölzel.

Nazi-era 

In May 1937, the Frankfurt auction house Hugo Helbing auctioned off the Flersheim collection and the couple fled to Amsterdam in the face of increasing anti-Semitic repression. In the Netherlands they were arrested and imprisoned. They were deported and died in the Bergen-Belsen concentration camp in 1944.

Claims for restitution 
After 1945, Edith Eberstadt (née Flersheim) made claims for restitution for artworks in the collection. A few paintings were located in private collections or public museums. Several restitutions or settlements took place. In May 2020, the Association for the Promotion of Fine Arts in Wiesbaden e. V. returned the  painting "Procession in the Mountains" by Adolf Hölzel, which was on permanent loan to the Wiesbaden Museum, to the heirs of the Flersheim family.

The efforts by the Flersheim's grandson, Walter Eberstadt, to recover art works by the Dutch painter Jan Toorop are documented at the Leo Baeck Institute.

In 2008, the Dutch Restitutions Committee issued binding resolutions concerning several of the Flersheim claims for restitution.

See also 
 The Holocaust
 The Holocaust in the Netherlands
 List of claims for restitution for Nazi-looted art

References 

German art collectors
Subjects of Nazi art appropriations
Jewish art collectors
German Jews who died in the Holocaust
Jewish emigrants from Nazi Germany to the Netherlands
1862 births
1944 deaths
German people who died in Bergen-Belsen concentration camp